Walenty Ziętara (born October 27, 1948) is a former Polish ice hockey player. He played for the Poland men's national ice hockey team at the 1972 Winter Olympics in Sapporo, and the 1976 Winter Olympics in Innsbruck.

References

1948 births
Living people
ATSE Graz players
Ice hockey players at the 1972 Winter Olympics
Ice hockey players at the 1976 Winter Olympics
Olympic ice hockey players of Poland
People from Nowy Targ
Polish ice hockey right wingers
Sportspeople from Lesser Poland Voivodeship